Slender Rising 2 is a terror psychological first person iOS game developed by Michael Hegemann and successor of Slender Rising. It was published on 16 January 2014 and runs on all Apple iOS devices from iPhone 3GS upwards. It is the sixth commercial video game adaptation based on the Slender Man Mythos.

Gameplay 

Slender Rising 2 is designed as a single-player game. As with the previous game, Slender Rising, the objective is to move around the enclosed location and search for particular items, whilst avoiding the mysterious hostile entity known as the Slender Man.

As with the predecessor, Slender Rising, the player must collect seven signs randomly scattered about the chosen map location, but one can now opt to play in a mode where they search the map for seven spirit-like entities known as the Lost Souls, and take photographs of them when near. The souls tend to run in multiple directions, but sometimes when found they move faster by each soul you find. If they ever run at you [which is done a lot] they're scared or they're warning you to turn around because Slender Man is around. The whisper sound effects signal if there are signs/lost souls nearby, as well as the compass if the user selects to use it. A camera crosshair is also seen when playing in the Lost Souls mode.

When playing the Signs of the End mode, the play can find a double barrelled shotgun with one shot somewhere in the map, the shotgun will not permanently kill the Slender Man, but it will make him disappear for quite some time when shot, the player will automatically shoot the Slender Man if he is too close to them (which under normal circumstances cannot be escaped from. However, a danger to equipping the shotgun is that when the Slender Man is not around, the player will aim the gun at their head at random, if they don't break free by swiping the screen in the same fashion as when the Slender Man stares them down, the player will shoot themselves, 
leading to an alternate game over screen.

The new game also introduces four new locations/maps: the Ghost Town; the Dark Mansion, a haunted house; the Frozen Castle; and the Grim District, a rustic abandoned town. Multiple options are available for visual ambience, including daytime, nighttime (in which the user can choose from a list of options for lighting), night vision, and others unique to the chosen map (including storm mode for Ghost Town and a vintage camera for Dark Mansion).

Reception 

"The Best Slender Man Mobile Game Yet" - TouchArcade (James Paterson/21 January 2014)

Links 
 Official Slender Rising 2 Trailer
 Slender Rising 2 on the App Store

References

2014 video games
IOS games
Slender Man
Works based on Internet-based works
Single-player video games